Canacea is a genus of beach flies in the family Canacidae. All known species are Nearctic or Neotropical.

Species
C. macateei Malloch, 1924
C. currani (Wirth, 1970)
C. aldrichi (Cresson, 1936)
C. snodgrassii (Coquillett, 1901)

References

Canacidae
Carnoidea genera